Julián Ríos (born March 11, 1941 in Vigo, Galicia) is a Spanish writer, most frequently classified as a postmodernist,  
whom  Mexican novelist Carlos Fuentes has called "the most inventive and creative" of Spanish-language writers. His first two books were written à deux with Octavio Paz.

His best known work, experimental and heavily influenced by the verbal inventiveness of James Joyce, was published in 1983 under the title Larva.

Ríos lives and works in France, on the outskirts of Paris.

Bibliography

Books 
 Puente de alma, Ed. Galaxia Gutenberg, 2009
 Quijote e hijos, Ed. Galaxia Gutenberg, 2008
 Larva y otras noches de Babel. Antología. Ed. F.C.E., 2008
 Cortejo de sombras: la novela de Tamoga, Galaxia Gutenberg, 2008
 Nuevos sombreros para Alicia, Seix Barral, 2001 (expanded version of 1993 book)
 La vida sexual de las palabras, Ed. Seix Barral, 2000
 Monstruario, Seix Barral, 1999
 Epifanías sin fin, Ed. Literatura y ciencia, 1995
 Amores que atan o Belles letres, Siruela, 1995
 Sombreros para Alicia, Muchnik Editores, 1993
 Retrato de Antonio Saura, Círculo de Arte, 1991
 Poundemonium, Ed. Llibres del Mall, 1985
 Larva. Babel de una noche de San Juan, Ed. Llibres del Mall, 1983
 Teatro de signos. Ed. Fundamentos, 1974 (with Octavio Paz)
 Solo a dos voces. Ed. Lumen, 1973 (with Octavio Paz)

In English
Loves That Bind
Monstruary
Kitaj: Pictures and Conversations, about U.S. artist R. B. Kitaj
Poundemonium
Larva: A Midsummer Night's Babel
House of Ulysses

Interviews 
 Interview with Julian Rios

References

1941 births
Spanish male writers
Living people